Cao Rulin (January 23, 1877 – August 1966, Midland, Michigan, United States) was Vice-Minister of Foreign Affairs of the Beiyang Government, and an important member of the pro-Japanese movement in the early 20th century. He was a Shanghai lawyer working in Beijing when he was appointed by the provisional president, Yuan Shikai, to a vacant seat in the National Assembly's senate in 1913.  He represented Outer Mongolia because Mongolia boycotted the elections after declaring independence during the Xinhai Revolution.  In 1915, he took Yuan Shikai's orders and signed the infamous "Twenty-One Demands" treaty with Japan.  He later became the leader of the New Communications Clique.

Cao Rulin was part of the Chinese envoy attending the Paris Peace Conference. At the conference many former German concessions in China were handed to Japan instead of back to China. This caused a great deal of unrest in China resulting in a student demonstration on May 4, 1919 outside Tiananmen. This was the beginning of the May Fourth Movement.

The demonstration shifted and Cao Rulin's house, at 3 Front Zhaojialou Lane in the East City District, was burned down. Cao was helped to escape by his friend, Nakae Ushikichi, son of Nakae Chōmin.

See also
 May Fourth Movement
 Twenty-One Demands
 Treaty of Versailles
 Shandong Problem

External links
 Front Zhaojialou Lane
 China in 20th Century - Adolescent China
 Tsao Ju-ling (Cao Rulin) 曹汝霖 from Biographies of Prominent Chinese c.1925.

Republic of China politicians from Shanghai
1966 deaths
1877 births
Progressive Party (China) politicians
Date of birth missing
Place of birth missing
Date of death missing
Place of death missing
Taiwanese people from Shanghai
Chinese Civil War refugees
People from Detroit
Chinese emigrants to the United States
Chinese people of World War I